

This is a list of the National Register of Historic Places listings in Barnstable County, Massachusetts.

This is intended to be a complete list of the properties and districts on the National Register of Historic Places in Barnstable County, Massachusetts, United States. Latitude and longitude coordinates are provided for many National Register properties and districts; these locations may be seen together in a map.

There are 205 properties and districts listed on the National Register in the county, including 3 National Historic Landmarks. Those in the town of Barnstable may be found at National Register of Historic Places listings in Barnstable, Massachusetts. Four listings appear in more than one of these lists because the boundaries cross geographic borders.

Current listings

Barnstable

Remainder of county

|}

See also
 
 List of National Historic Landmarks in Massachusetts
 National Register of Historic Places listings in Massachusetts

References

History of Barnstable County, Massachusetts
Barnstable County